Vivienne Benesch is a theatre director and former artistic director of the Chautauqua Theatre who is currently artistic director at North Carolina's PlayMakers Repertory Company, a position she has held since 2016. As part of her work at PlayMakers, Benesch focuses on amplifying the work of women playwrights through their @PLAY program.

Benesch trained as an actor and received her MFA from Tisch School of the Arts and has been on the faculty of Juilliard. As an actor, Benesch won an Obie Award in 2005 for her role in Lee Blessing's Going to St. Ives and played opposite Dame Maggie Smith in a 2007 London production of The Lady from Dubuque. In 2017, she received the Zelda Fichandler Award.

In 2019, she made her Washington, D.C. directorial debut with the Folger Theatre production of Love's Labor Lost. In 2022, she'll direct Noah Haidle's Birthday Candles, starring NYU classmate Debra Messing.

References

Obie Award recipients
Tisch School of the Arts alumni
Juilliard School faculty
American theatre directors
Artistic directors
Year of birth missing (living people)
Living people
Women theatre directors